Visual Communication is a quarterly peer-reviewed academic journal that covers the visual dimension of language and communication. The journal's editors-in-chief are Louise Ravelli (University of New South Wales) and Janina Wildfeuer (University of Groningen).  It was established in 2002 and is published by SAGE Publications.

Abstracting and indexing
The journal is abstracted and indexed in Scopus and the Social Sciences Citation Index. According to the Journal Citation Reports, the journal has a 2021 impact factor of 1.790.

References

External links

SAGE Publishing academic journals
English-language journals
Communication journals
Quarterly journals
Publications established in 2002